The Lusaka Stock Exchange (abbreviated to LuSE) is the principal stock exchange of Zambia. Founded in 1993, it is located in Lusaka. The LuSE is a member of the African Stock Exchanges Association.

As of 14 April 2022, the LuSE has 25 listed companies with a market capitalisation of ZMW 71.69 billion (US$ 4.1 billion).

History
The Lusaka Stock Exchange (LuSE) was established with preparatory technical assistance from the International Finance Corporation (IFC) and the World Bank in 1993. The Exchange opened on 21 February 1994. In its first two years of operations, the LuSE and Securities and Exchange Commission (SEC) were funded by the UNDP and Government of Zambia as a project for financial and capital market development in Zambia, under the multi-component private sector development program. The formation of LuSE was part of the government’s economic reform program aimed at developing the financial and capital market in order to support and enhance private sector initiative. It was also expected to attract foreign portfolio investment through recognition of Zambia and the region as an emerging capital market with potentially high investment returns. Another important role of LuSE was to facilitate the divestiture of Government ownership in parastatals and realization of the objectives of creating a broad and wide shareholding ownership by the citizenry via a fair and transparent process. The 1972 Securities Act revised to facilitate the establishment of the Securities Exchange. It was structured around models of a modern Stock Exchange with automated clearing and settlement facilities through a Central Securities Depository (CSD). The Government of the Republic of Zambia (GRZ) provided grant financing to LuSE from 1993 till 2009. Subsequently, GRZ stopped providing support and LuSE became totally dependent on its listed companies to generate operational revenues. The sustainability of LuSE became dependent on increasing the number and size of companies that listed on the Exchange. In 2005, the company introduced its own governance code for listed companies. All Africa later called the code "a landmark achievement in the development of corporate governance in Zambia."

The LuSE, since inception, has expanded beyond being a platform for trading shares and bonds, as demonstrated by some companies from across the spectrum of industry that have used it to raise the public capital for expansion. Among its largest companies in 2022, were Copperbelt Energy Corporation, and Zambia Sugar. In January 2022, it was reported that the LuSE topped the list of the Best performing exchanges in Africa with a 93.2% gain. In March 2022, the LuSE launched the online GEM Portal, an initiative approved by the Securities and Exchange Commission of Zambia to provide start-ups, small and medium businesses with access to funding to assist the growth of new business ventures and rebuild businesses impacted by the Covid-19 pandemic. In September 2022, the government of Zambia announced a zero withholding tax on interest from investment in green bonds on the local bourse to stimulate green investments. At the end of that month, the Lusaka Securities Exchange All Share Index had strengthened 28% YTD in dollar terms of which 17% is attributed to third quarter in comparison to the S&P500 which had slid 25% amidst a global environment characterized by excessive inflation, soft commodity price dislocations and monetary policy tightening.

Mission statement and mandate 
To provide investors, businesses and other issuers with an efficient, reliable, orderly, transparent and cost effective platform for the raising of capital and trading of securities.

The LuSE’s core mandate is to provide a fair and efficient platform through transparent and equitable trading of the listed securities. LuSE contributes to wealth development, financial services and a platform for investment for foreign and local investors. It provides a platform where companies can raise long term capital and secondary trading of shares. LuSE also provides facilities for the listing of securities and provides users with an orderly, transparent and regulated platform to trade.

Market listings
As of October 2010 there were 22 Listings on the LuSE
As of April 2022 there were 25 Listings on the LuSE

Alternative Market 
In May 2016, the Lusaka Stock Exchange announced the introduction of the LuSE Alt-M, an alternative market for small and medium sized enterprise to participate in.

See also
Economy of Zambia
List of African stock exchanges
List of stock exchanges
Gold as an investment
List of countries by copper production
List of companies in Zambia

References

External links
Website of Lusaka Stock Exchange
https://www.pwc.com/zm/en/assets/pdf/listed-companies-analysis-report-2020.pdf

Stock exchanges in Zambia
 
Companies based in Lusaka
Financial services companies established in 1993
1993 establishments in Zambia